Leaota River may refer to:

 Leaota, another name for the upper course of the Raciu in Dâmbovița County, Romania
 Leaota, a tributary of the Zârna in Argeș County, Romania

See also 
 Leaota Mountains, Romania